ICI-190,622 is an anxiolytic drug used in scientific research. It is a pyrazolopyridine derivative, related to other anxiolytic compounds such as tracazolate, and more distantly to zaleplon. It has similar effects to benzodiazepine drugs, but is structurally distinct and so is classed as a nonbenzodiazepine anxiolytic.

See also 
 Cartazolate
 Etazolate
 Tracazolate

References 

Allyl compounds
Alkyne derivatives
Anxiolytics
Carboxamides
GABAA receptor positive allosteric modulators
Pyrazolopyridines